The 1886 Waitemata by-election was a by-election held on 11 December 1886 in the  electorate during the 9th New Zealand Parliament.

The by-election was caused by the death of the incumbent MP William John Hurst on 29 September 1886.

The by-election was won by Richard Monk who beat Harry Farnall. Farnall was ridiculed by one report, saying that Monk deserves to be called a "working man" not Farnall.

Results
The following table gives the election result.

References

Waitemata 1886
1886 elections in New Zealand
Politics of the Auckland Region
1880s in Auckland